Xiao Sha (born 15 June 1992) is a retired Chinese gymnast. She was an all-rounder, with a balance of skills on all four apparata: her strongest was the balance beam.

Gymnastics career
Xiao Sha started training in gymnastics at age 6. She medaled at the Chinese national championships, including gold for all-round in 2006, silver for all-round in 2007, gold for balance beam in 2008 and gold for all-round and balance beam in 2009. She was also the leading gymnast for the Guizhou team, competing on all four apparatus in the team events. At the 11th Chinese national games in 2009, Xiao came 7th in all-round, 8th on balance beam and 5th on floor, while the Guizhou team she led came 7th.

At the international level, Xiao was part of the Chinese team at the 2007 World Championships, where China won silver. She came 7th in the all-round final. In 2008, she won gold on balance beam and bronze on floor at the Cottbus World Cup, and repeated those results at the Ostrava World Cup later that year.

She announced her retirement in December 2009.

Routines

 Bars-Clear hip, Ray, Ling, Piked Jaeger, Pak salto, Toe on shoot to HB, Healy, Straddled Jaeger, Double layout full
 Beam-Front aerial to the side of the beam, two flics to a layout, full turn with leg at horizontal, front aerial to flic to layout step-out, front tuck, split jump, sheep jump, back tuck, switch ring, switch split, round off, double pike back.
 Floor- Piked full twisting double back,1 1/2 twist to front full, switch split, switch split 1/2, Memmel, 2 1/2 twist, double turn w/ leg at horizontal, double pike back

Competitive history

References

External links
 

1992 births
Living people
Chinese female artistic gymnasts
Medalists at the World Artistic Gymnastics Championships
Gymnasts from Guizhou
People from Qiandongnan
Bouyei people